The Asia and Pacific Rim Peace Conference was held in Beijing, China from October 2–12, 1952. Delegates from dozens of countries attended the conference, which including a number of speeches and opening remarks by Chinese communist leader Mao Zedong.

The gathering took place against the backdrop of the Korean War and the growing Cold War between the communist East and democratic West. It coincided with the heyday of positive Sino-Soviet relations. Delegates, mainly affiliated with domestic communist parties, traveled to Beijing from Canada, the United States, Guatemala, Colombia, Pakistan, India and Indonesia. Resolutions were passed, including a signed declaration by the Pakistani and Indian delegates supporting a negotiated settlement to any differences and the resolution of the Kashmir question "by the people of the Kashmir."

References

1952 in China
Korean War
Cold War treaties
Diplomatic conferences in China
1952 in international relations
20th-century diplomatic conferences
20th century in Beijing
1952 conferences